The Hasegawa school (長谷川派, -ha) was a school (style) of Japanese painting founded in the 16th century by Hasegawa Tōhaku and disappeared around the beginning of the 18th century.

The school painted mostly fusuma (sliding doors), was based largely on the style of the Kanō school, and was centered in Kyoto. A relatively small school, the majority of its painters were students of Tōhaku and of various Kanō masters. Tōhaku himself was a student of Kanō Eitoku and is said to have considered himself the stylistic successor to Sesshū. He painted largely in monochrome ink, in largely Chinese-inspired styles, and is particularly famous for his depictions of monkeys.

Hasegawa artists of note
Hasegawa Tōhaku (1539–1610)
Hasegawa Kyūzō (1568–1593)
Hasegawa Sōtaku (fl. c. 1650)
Hasegawa Sakon (fl. c. 1650)
Hasegawa Sōya (d. 1667)
Hasegawa Yōshin (d. 1726)

References
 Frederic, Louis (2002). Japan Encyclopedia. Cambridge, Mass.: Harvard University Press.

Schools of Japanese art